Trite planiceps, commonly known as the black-headed jumping spider, is a common jumping spider (Salticidae) endemic to New Zealand and one of about 150 species of jumping spiders in New Zealand.

Taxonomy 
Trite planiceps was first described in 1873 as Salticus minax from specimens collected from Riccarton Bush, Governor Bay and the North Island.Trite planiceps was later described again in 1899 as its current name by Eugene Simon. In 2011, T. planiceps was redescribed after DNA sequences were used to provide molecular evidence for the taxonomy of this species

The holotypes were stored at the Muséum national d'histoire naturelle but are thought to have been lost.

Description
Males and females range in body length from 6 to 13.5 mm. The cephalothorax and first pair of legs are jet black. The elongated abdomen is golden brown, with a central yellow stripe, and sometimes has a greenish sheen. In males, the first pair of legs is elongated, there is a row of dark hairs above the frontal eyes, and the chelicerae (mouthparts) are more robust.

Behaviour

Hunting 
While most jumping spider rely mostly on their very acute eyesight, T. planiceps has been shown to seize on prey in the dark, probably by means of vibratory signals. Unlike typical jumping spiders, they do not make nightly web shelters. As T. planiceps lives in low altitudes, this could be an adaptation to cool overcast winters, where they need to survive within the dim recesses of rolled-up leaves of New Zealand flax (Phormium tenax) and similar plants. These leaves are typically one to two meters long and 5 to 10 cm wide.

Courtship 
They also change from vision-based courtship in the open to vibratory courtship when mating inside a rolled-up leaf. If an immature female is within about ten days of maturing, the male will live with her for this time and then mate inside the leaf. The two are in physical contact for a while after mating, and communicate using tactile signals. Upon entering a rolled-up leaf, both sexes will tap the leaf surface with the first pair of legs and vibrate their abdomen.

Nest building 
Juveniles and subadults build flat, tubular silk cocoons with a door at each end inside rolled up leaves. Adult females build a silk platform 50% longer and two to three times wider than their own size before laying up to seven egg batches with 8 to 40 eggs each. Each batch is enclosed in its own silk casing. Males normally do not build nests.

A wide array of behavioral patterns has been observed, among others ritualized male duels.

Interactions with humans 
Due to their docile nature, bites from Trite planiceps are very rare (members of the public frequently handle them without getting bitten). Bites from T. planiceps only occur when the spider is acting defensively as a last resort. One case study of a T. planiceps bite reported that an individual was bitten when he rolled over while in bed and was unaware of a single T. planiceps in his shirt. The bite caused a stinging like sensation in his lower shoulder blades and left two puncture marks 1mm apart. After four hours, the skin surrounding the puncture mark had formed a red halo. The swelling and tenderness settled shortly after and the redness faded after 72 hours.

References

External links

 Jumping spiders (family Salticidae), Museum of New Zealand Te Papa Tongarewa
 Salticidae.org: Diagnostic drawings + photographs

Salticidae
Spiders of New Zealand
Spiders described in 1899